Padley Chapel is a building in Grindleford, England, on the site of the former Padley Hall (or Padley Manor). It is a Grade I listed building.

Padley Hall 
Padley Hall was a large double courtyard house where, in 1588, two Catholic priests (Nicholas Garlick and Robert Ludlam) were discovered. At the time to be a Catholic priest, ordained abroad was deemed treason;  the two were tried and found guilty, two weeks later, they were hanged, drawn and quartered in Derby. They became known as the 'Padley Martyrs'. The house today is mostly in ruins, and is a Scheduled Monument. Garlick’s head was by tradition buried in the graveyard of Tideswell parish church, but there is no evidence of this.

Chapel 
Part of Padley Hall—probably originally the central gatehouse range—survives, and in 1933 was converted to a Catholic chapel in honour of the martyrs. The chapel is a Grade I listed building which stands not far from the railway line, a short distance west of Grindleford railway station. A pilgrimage takes place every year in July.

See also
Grade I listed churches in Derbyshire
Grade I listed buildings in Derbyshire
Listed buildings in Grindleford

References 

Grade I listed buildings in Derbyshire
Scheduled monuments in Derbyshire
Roman Catholic churches in Derbyshire
Roman Catholic Diocese of Hallam
Roman Catholic shrines in the United Kingdom
Grade I listed Roman Catholic churches in England